Jump Up is the second studio album by Supercar. It was released on March 10, 1999. It peaked at number 12 on the Oricon Albums Chart.

Track listing

Personnel
Credits adapted from the liner notes.
 Koji Nakamura – vocals, guitar
 Junji Ishiwatari – guitar
 Miki Furukawa – vocals, bass guitar
 Kodai Tazawa – drums

Charts

References

External links
 

1999 albums
Supercar (band) albums
Epic Records albums